Selenean summit refers to the "highest" point on the Moon, notionally similar to Mount Everest on the Earth.

At some 10,786 m (35,387 ft) above the lunar mean, it is nearly twenty percent 'taller' than Earth's relative highest point, Everest. The summit is located along the north-eastern rim of Engel'gardt crater. Although methods of measurement differ somewhat (e.g., the Moon lacks a sea level), since its discovery in 2010 by the LRO teams, nowhere else has surpassed this region's height measurements on the lunar surface.

The summit is located on the far side of the Moon relative to Earth.

See also
Mons Huygens

References

External links
A video journey to the summit area outlining some peaks in the region.
Links to other data and information can be found on  http://lroc.sese.asu.edu/

Moon